is a Japanese professional cyclist currently rides for UCI Continental team .

In 2019 he won the Japanese National Road Race Championships.  For the 2021 season, he rode for amateur team Yowamushi Pedal Cycling Team.

Major results

2014
 3rd Tour de Okinawa
2015
 2nd Tour de Okinawa
 8th Overall Tour de Hokkaido
2016
 9th Overall Tour de Kumano
 10th Tour de Okinawa
2017
 1st Stage 1 Tour de Kumano
 7th Overall Tour of Thailand
2018
 1st Stage 2 Tour of Thailand
 1st Stage 2 Tour de Kumano
 4th Road race, National Road Championships
 5th Overall Tour de Tochigi
2019
 1st  Road race, National Road Championships
2021
 9th Road race, National Road Championships

References

External links
 
 
 

1989 births
Living people
Japanese male cyclists
Sportspeople from Nara Prefecture